One Bullet Is Enough (French: Une balle suffit, Spanish:La canción del penal) is a 1954 French-Spanish crime film directed by Juan Lladó and Jean Sacha and starring Georges Ulmer, Véra Norman and Jacques Castelot.

Synopsis 
After leaving the prison where they have served their sentence, some criminals plan a new robbery.

Cast
 Georges Ulmer as Carmo  
 Véra Norman as Florence Davis 
 Jacques Castelot as Me Fidler  
 André Valmy as Stauner 
 Mercedes Barranco as Rita  
 Barta Barri as Patorni 
 Mario Bustos 
 José María Cases 
 Jesús Colomer 
 Mercedes de la Aldea 
 Gerardo Esteban 
 Arsenio Freignac as Donny  
 Salvador Garrido 
 Manuel Gas as Blanco  
 Ramón Hernández 
 Luis Induni 
 Juan Monfort 
 César Ojinaga 
 Rafael Romero Marchent

References

Bibliography 
  Magí Crusells. Directores de cine en Cataluña: de la A a la Z. Edicions Universitat Barcelona, 2009.

External links 
 

1954 crime drama films
Spanish crime drama films
French crime drama films
1954 films
1950s Spanish-language films
Films directed by Juan Lladó
Films produced by Ignacio F. Iquino
Films scored by Augusto Algueró
French black-and-white films
Spanish black-and-white films
1950s Spanish films
1950s French films
Spanish-language French films